The 1905 Yukon general election was held on 12 April 1905 to elect five of the ten members of the Yukon Territorial Council.

The other five members were appointed.

Members elected

References

Elections in Yukon
1905 elections in Canada
1905 in Yukon
April 1905 events